Lerodea is a genus of skippers in the family Hesperiidae.

Species
Lerodea eufala (Edwards, 1869) - type species by original genus designation 
Lerodea arabus (Edwards, 1882)
Lerodea casta (Hayward, 1942)
Lerodea emba (Evans, 1955)
Lerodea erythrostictus (Prittwitz, 1868)
Lerodea gracia (Dyar, 1913)
Lerodea sonex Grishin, 2022
Lerodea williamsi (Hayward, 1942)

References

Natural History Museum Lepidoptera genus database

Hesperiinae
Hesperiidae genera